The 2017 ICC Champions Trophy was the eighth ICC Champions Trophy, a cricket tournament for the eight top-ranked One Day International (ODI) teams in the world. It was held in England and Wales from 1 to 18 June 2017. Pakistan won the competition for the first time with a 180-run victory over India in the final at The Oval. The margin of victory was the largest by any team in the final of an ICC ODI tournament in terms of runs.

The top eight teams in the ICC ODI Championship rankings as on 30 September 2015 qualified for the tournament, and were divided into two groups of four. Bangladesh returned to the ICC Champions Trophy for the first time since 2006, while the West Indies failed to qualify for the first time.

Security around the tournament was increased following the Ariana Grande concert attack in Manchester, just before the start of the competition. The International Cricket Council (ICC) announced that they would review security concerns.

The ICC Champions Trophy was due to end in 2013, with the 2013 competition the final one, to be replaced by the ICC World Test Championship in 2017. However, in January 2014 it was instead confirmed by the ICC that a Champions Trophy tournament would take place in 2017. In 2016, the ICC confirmed that the Champions Trophy would be scrapped after this tournament, keeping in line with the ICC's goal of having one tournament for each of the three formats of international cricket. In November 2021, the ICC confirmed that the tournament would return in 2025, hosted in Pakistan.

Qualification
As hosts, England qualified for the competition automatically; they were joined by the seven other highest-ranked teams in the ICC ODI Championship as at 30 September 2015.

Venues
On 1 June 2016, it was announced that the 2017 ICC Champions Trophy would be held across three venues: The Oval, Edgbaston and Sophia Gardens. The ICC confirmed the umpires for all matches and venues on 18 May 2017.

Squads

The eight participating teams were required to announce a 15-member squad for the tournament on or before 25 April 2017. Teams could make changes to their originally named squads up to 25 May 2017, after which date changes would only be accepted on medical grounds, subject to approval.

India did not announce their squad by 25 April deadline due to what it described as "operational" reasons, although this was widely seen as a protest by the Board of Control for Cricket in India (BCCI) in an ongoing disagreement with the ICC over finance and governance. The BCCI were scheduled to announce the squad for India after the ICC board meeting on 27 April 2017. However, on 4 May 2017, after no team had been named, the committee of administrators told the BCCI to select their squad immediately. The BCCI undertook a special general meeting on 7 May 2017 to determine what course of action they would take. The outcome of that meeting was that India would take part in the tournament, and the squad was named on 8 May 2017.

On 10 May 2017, the ICC confirmed all the squads for the tournament. Pakistan's Shoaib Malik played in his sixth consecutive Champions Trophy.

Warm-up matches

Before the tournament started, England and South Africa played a bilateral three-match ODI series leaving the other six teams to play warm-ups against two other teams not in their group. These warm-up matches had rules that were slightly different from normal ODI matches, and were thus not recognised as ODIs. A team could use up to 15 players in a match, but only 11 could bat (or field at any one time) in each innings.

Group stage
The fixtures were announced on 1 June 2016.

Group A

Group B

Knock-out stage

Semi-finals
England became the first team to qualify for the semi-finals by virtue of two wins in its first two Group A games, and with other teams of the group either losing a game or ending games without a result. Bangladesh qualified for the semi-finals following their win against New Zealand, and Australia failing to beat England in the final match of Group A. From Group B, India and Pakistan qualified for the semi-finals following victories in their final group matches against South Africa and Sri Lanka respectively.

The ICC confirmed the umpires for the semi-final matches on 13 June 2017 and for the final on 16 June 2017. Pakistan beat England by 8 wickets to qualify for the final for the first time while India beat Bangladesh by 9 wickets to make their second consecutive appearance and fourth overall in a final.

Final

Statistics

Batting
Most runs

Bowling
Most wickets

Team of the Tournament
The team of the tournament was named by the ICC the day after the final. The team included seven members of the 22 players who featured in the final, as well as three Englishmen, a Bangladeshi and a New Zealander.
 Shikhar Dhawan
 Fakhar Zaman
 Tamim Iqbal
 Virat Kohli
 Joe Root
 Ben Stokes
 Sarfaraz Ahmed (c & wk)
 Adil Rashid
 Junaid Khan
 Bhuvneshwar Kumar
 Hasan Ali
 Kane Williamson (12th man)

Media and promotion
In a media release before the commencement of the tournament, the ICC stated that live broadcast would be made available in "more than 200 territories, across five continents". The release added that the tournament's broadcast would reach China, South Korea, Thailand and Indonesia for the first time.

The prize money for the competition was increased by $500,000 from 2013 to a total of $4.5 million. The winning team received $2.2 million, with $1.1 million going to the runner-up. The other two semi-finalists earned $450,000 each. Teams finishing third and fourth in each group each received $90,000 and $60,000 respectively.

References

External links

 Tournament home at ESPN Cricinfo

 
2017 in English cricket
2017 in Welsh sport
ICC Champions Trophy tournaments
International cricket competitions in 2017
International cricket competitions in England
International cricket competitions in Wales
June 2017 sports events in the United Kingdom